Punjab Food Department is a department of Government of Punjab, Pakistan.
Food Department is responsible for regulating business of food grains which include purchase, storage, sales and milling.

Functions
Functions of the Food Department are:
 Procurement of wheat for issuance to the mills
 Ensure Food Security in wheat and wheat products
 Transportation from surplus to deficit regions
 Protection of wheat from pest and other hazards
 Undertaking all activity related to export of wheat up to supply at port

Attached Departments 
 Ministry of National Food Security & Research 
 Punjab Agriculture Department
 Punjab Food Authority

External links
 Punjab Food Department

References

Departments of Government of Punjab, Pakistan
Agriculture in Punjab, Pakistan